The Cesar River is a river in northern Colombia which is a part of the Magdalena Basin. It flows through the Cesar-Ranchería Basin and separates the Sierra Nevada de Santa Marta from the mountain ranges of the Serranía del Perijá, an extension of the Cordillera Oriental. It flows north to south, down from the Sierra Nevada de Santa Marta in the Guajira Department onto the Cesar Department and flowing into the Zapatosa Marsh where it turns to the southwest and discharges into the Magdalena River. Valledupar is the only major city on its route.

Tributaries 
 Badillo River
 Guatapuri River
 Ariguani River
 Villanueva River,  in length out of the Cerro Pintao.
 Various streams of the Zapatosa Marshes including the
 Bartolazo wetlands;
 Pancuiche wetlands;
 Pancuichito wetlands;
 La Palma wetlands;
 Santo Domingo wetlands; and
 Tiojuancho wetlands.

References

Further reading 
 Striffler, Luis (1989) El Río César: Relación de un viaje a la Sierra Nevada de Santa Marta en 1876 Senado de la República, Bogotá, 

Rivers of Colombia
Magdalena River
Geography of Cesar Department
Sierra Nevada de Santa Marta